This article describes the main round of the 2015–16 Women's EHF Champions League.

Qualified teams

Format
In each group, teams played against each other in a double round-robin format, with home and away matches against teams they did not met before. Points obtained in the group stage were taken over. After completion of the group stage matches, the top four teams of each group advanced to the quarterfinals.

Tiebreakers
In the group stage, teams are ranked according to points (2 points for a win, 1 point for a draw, 0 points for a loss). After completion of the group stage, if two or more teams have scored the same number of points, the ranking will be determined as follows (article 4.3.1, section II of regulations):

Highest number of points in matches between the teams directly involved;
Superior goal difference in matches between the teams directly involved;
Highest number of goals scored in matches between the teams directly involved (or in the away match in case of a two-team tie);
Superior goal difference in all matches of the group;
Highest number of plus goals in all matches of the group;
If the ranking of one of these teams is determined, the above criteria are consecutively followed until the ranking of all teams is determined. If no ranking can be determined, the following criteria apply:
Drawing of lots.

During the group stage, only criteria 1, 4 and 5 apply to determine the provisional ranking of teams.

Groups

Group 1

Group 2

References

External links
Official website

2015–16 Women's EHF Champions League